The women's 1500 metres at the 2016 IAAF World Indoor Championships took place on March 18 and 19, 2016.

Ethiopia managed to put three athletes into this final, but the early leader was Melissa Duncan who broke away for the first three laps.  The peloton was not concerned until just before the 1 km mark, when Sifan Hassan made a move forward.  That move was taken seriously with the Ethiopians, Brenda Martinez and Violah Lagat all scrambling to line up behind her.  But after assuming the lead, Hassan didn't try to accelerate, instead slowing the pace while the pack jostled for position behind her, with the tiring Duncan in the middle as yet another obstacle.  With two laps to go, Hassan accelerated again, this time breaking away from the pack.  At the bell only Dawit Seyaum and Gudaf Tsegay were able to stay with her.  Along the back stretch and through the final turn, Seyaum pulled onto Hassan's outside shoulder with the obvious intent to pass her coming off the turn.  Instead, Hassan just accelerated away from Seyaum to take the gold.

Results

Heats
Qualification: First 3 (Q) and next 3 fastest (q) qualified for the final.

Final
The final was started on March 19 at 19:18.

References

1500 metres
1500 metres at the World Athletics Indoor Championships
2016 in women's athletics